
This is intended to be a complete list of the properties and districts on the National Register of Historic Places in downtown Cincinnati, Ohio, United States. Downtown Cincinnati is defined as being all of the city south of Central Parkway, west of Interstates 71 and 471, and east of Interstate 75. The locations of National Register properties and districts may be seen in an online map.

There are 277 properties and districts listed on the National Register in Cincinnati, including 12 National Historic Landmarks. Downtown Cincinnati includes 61 of these properties and districts, including 5 National Historic Landmarks; the city's remaining properties and districts are listed elsewhere.

Current listings

|}

Former listings

|}

See also
List of National Historic Landmarks in Ohio
National Register of Historic Places listings in Cincinnati, Ohio

References

Downtown